Steven George Hanna (Birth date: 30 October 1958 in Nassau, Bahamas) is a Bahamian triple jumper who competed in the 1984 Summer Olympics and in the 1988 Summer Olympics. He won a silver medal in the long jump at the 1982 Commonwealth Games, and at the same games finished fourth in the triple jump.

Steven Hanna jumped 56’1 in the CAC Games in Nassau representing his beloved home - The Bahamas.

Mr. Hanna was the 1980 and 1981 NCAA Triple Jump Champion competing for the University of Texas-El Paso. Steve anchored two NCAA titles in Track and Field for the UTEP Miners.

References

1958 births
Living people
Sportspeople from Nassau, Bahamas
Bahamian male triple jumpers
Bahamian male long jumpers
Olympic athletes of the Bahamas
Athletes (track and field) at the 1984 Summer Olympics
Athletes (track and field) at the 1988 Summer Olympics
Pan American Games competitors for the Bahamas
Athletes (track and field) at the 1983 Pan American Games
Athletes (track and field) at the 1987 Pan American Games
Commonwealth Games silver medallists for the Bahamas
Commonwealth Games medallists in athletics
Athletes (track and field) at the 1978 Commonwealth Games
Athletes (track and field) at the 1982 Commonwealth Games
Central American and Caribbean Games gold medalists for the Bahamas
Competitors at the 1978 Central American and Caribbean Games
Competitors at the 1982 Central American and Caribbean Games
Central American and Caribbean Games medalists in athletics
Medallists at the 1982 Commonwealth Games